is a side-scrolling hack-and-slash video game released by Sega for arcades in 1989, running on the Sega System 16B arcade hardware. Makoto Uchida was the lead designer of the game, and was also responsible for the creation of the previous year's Altered Beast. The game casts players as one of three warriors who must free the fantastical land of Yuria from the tyrannical rule of Death Adder, who wields the titular Golden Axe.

The game was well received at the time of release, Golden Axe was later converted for play on many different home systems, including Sega's own Mega Drive/Genesis and Master System. The game's success spawned an entire franchise consisting of several sequels and various spin-offs.

Plot
The game takes place in the fictional land of Yuria, a Conan the Barbarian-style high fantasy medieval world. An evil entity known as Death Adder has captured the King and his daughter, and holds them captive in their castle.  He also finds the Golden Axe, the magical emblem of Yuria, and threatens to destroy both the axe and the royal family unless the people of Yuria accept him as their ruler. Three warriors set out on a quest to rescue Yuria and avenge their losses at the hands of Death Adder. The first is a battle axe-wielding dwarf, Gilius Thunderhead, from the mines of Wolud, whose twin brother was killed by the soldiers of Death Adder. Another is a male barbarian, Ax Battler, wielding a two-handed broadsword, looking for revenge for the murder of his mother. The last is a longsword-wielding Amazon, Tyris Flare, whose parents were both killed by Death Adder.

The warriors rescue the inhabitants of the ransacked Turtle Village, which turns out to be situated on the shell of a giant turtle. The turtle takes the characters across the sea, and they then fly to the castle itself on the back of a giant eagle. Once at the castle they defeat Death Adder, who is wielding the Golden Axe, and save the land. In the Mega Drive/Genesis and PC versions, and also in other ports, the characters also battle Death Adder's mentor, Death Bringer, as the true final boss. After the final battle, the warriors receive a magical golden axe that imbues the player with immortality.

The arcade release of the game concludes with a fourth wall breaking end sequence with some children playing Golden Axe at an arcade. The arcade game breaks, and the characters from within the game flood into the "real world," with the children being chased by the enemies, with the warriors in hot pursuit.

Gameplay
Progress is made through the game by fighting through Death Adder's henchmen, including men armed with clubs and maces, skeleton warriors, and knights. Players are able to attack using their weapon, jump and cast spells that hurt all enemies on the screen. The force of this magic depends on the number of "bars" of magic power currently available. The bars are filled by collecting blue "magic potions" attained by kicking little sprites who then drop the potions. These sprites appear during regular levels and during bonus stages in between levels. The male warrior Ax is able to cast earth spells. The dwarf Gilius casts lightning spells and the female warrior Tyris casts fire magic. Each character has a different maximum number of magic bars and varying ranges of attack.

Various steeds known as bizarrians are found in the game. These can be ridden when the enemy rider is knocked off, or if one is found dormant. The least powerful steed is known as the Cockatrice (which also appeared in Altered Beast), which can be used to knock down enemies with a swipe of its tail. The more powerful dragon, which can either shoot fireballs or breathe fire depending on its color scheme, is found later in the game.

If the players take too long to advance, skeleton swordsmen emerge from the ground, like in the film Jason and the Argonauts.

In addition to the main quest, some home versions of the game included "duel mode", a survival mode type game that pitted players against increasingly powerful foes in consecutive rounds of play. This mode also featured a two-player one-on-one option.

Development
Lead designer and producer Makoto Uchida was fond of action movies, particularly the Conan films, and wanted to create a game influenced by them. He said that the development team for the game was small and development of the game took about a year. Uchida's "idea was to come up with a Double Dragon that was not a Double Dragon… Technos was an experienced rival who had been working on the Kunio-Kun series, so there was no way we could compete if we did the same thing as them. I had a feeling that arcade games should be competitive against the great hit console title Dragon Quest (created by Enix) and therefore studied the world of magic and swords, combined this with the gameplay of Double Dragon, and finally came up with the concept of Golden Axe." Uchida also cited the original Street Fighter (1987) as an influence, particularly how players could combine button moves and stick presses to perform individual attacks.

Ports
The Mega Drive/Genesis version remained largely faithful to the arcade game, adding a level and a duel mode, along with a new ending.

The IBM PC compatible port released in 1990 is similar to the Mega Drive/Genesis version, but includes a 256 color VGA mode as well as  support for EGA,  CGA, and Hercules modes. Atari ST and Amiga ports released in late 1990 by Virgin Software are similar to the arcade. The Amiga port is similar to the arcade game, with some palette changes and without parallax scrolling.

Variations of the original game have also been released. The Master System version of the game retells the original story from the perspective of Tarik, a barbarian with resemblances to Ax Battler (much like all the other barbarian in the entire series: Kain Grinder, Stern Blade and Kain Blade). While the game is only one-player, it features all of the levels and magic powers of the arcade version. In Japan, Golden Axe was released by Telenet for the PC Engine CD-ROM in 1990 with high-quality resampled music and cut scenes.

Reception

Commercial
In Japan, Game Machine listed Golden Axe on their 1 July 1989 issue as being the second most successful table arcade cabinet of the month. It went on to be the 18th highest-grossing arcade game of 1989 in Japan. In the United States, it was the highest-grossing arcade game of January 1990.

The ZX Spectrum version went to number 2 in the UK sales charts, behind Teenage Mutant Ninja Turtles. The Xbox Live Arcade digital version of Golden Axe sold 167,935 units on the Xbox 360 console, .

Accolades
Upon release of the home conversions, the game received the "C+VG Hit!" award from Computer and Video Games, the "Star Buy" award from The One for Amiga Games, the "Zero Console Classic" award from Zero magazine, and a Gold Medal from Zzap!64 magazine.

In 1991, PC Format named Golden Axe one of the 50 best computer games ever, describing it as "deliciously animated hacking, slashing and generally whaling". In 1993, the ZX Spectrum version of the game was voted number 60 in the Your Sinclair Readers' Top 100 Games of All Time. In 1995, Flux magazine rated the Mega Drive version 70th in their "Top 100 Video Games." In 1996, GamesMaster ranked the Mega Drive version 100th on their "Top 100 Games of All Time."

Retrospective
Reviewing the game's appearance in Sega Arcade Classics for the Sega CD in 1993, Glenn Rubenstein commented that the game had become outdated in the years since its original release.

Retrospectively, GameRankings gave the Sega Genesis version an aggregate rating of 69% based on six reviews published online in the 2000s. Metacritic gave the Xbox 360 version an aggregate rating of 68 out of 100.

TouchArcade rated the iOS version 3.5 out of 5 stars.

Releases

The Mega Drive/Genesis version was later released in other compilations–Sega Smash Pack, Sega Genesis Collection (Sega Mega Drive Collection), Sonic's Ultimate Genesis Collection (Sega Mega Drive Ultimate Collection)–and on the Virtual Console. A one-player only Sega CD version released as part of the Sega Classics Arcade Collection, with CD audio background music and voice-overs from the arcade version.

The arcade version is also on the Virtual Console and Xbox Live Arcade. A port of the game was released on PlayStation Network on 12 July 2011 and has been available free for PlayStation Plus users.

The game was  released as part of the handheld TV game Arcade Legends Sega Genesis Volume 1. An enhanced remake with 3D graphics and orchestral music was released for PlayStation 2 as part of the Sega Ages line.

In August 2017, the Mega Drive/Genesis version was released for iOS and Android. It is now part of the Sega Forever service.

On 25 October 2021, The Mega Drive/Genesis version was released on the Nintendo Switch Online + Expansion Pack.

Notes

References

External links

1989 video games
Amiga games
Amstrad CPC games
Aspect Co. games
Atari ST games
Commodore 64 games
Cooperative video games
DOS games
Fantasy video games
IOS games
Master System games
PlayStation Network games
Sega arcade games
Sega beat 'em ups
Sega Genesis games
Side-scrolling beat 'em ups
TurboGrafx-CD games
Hack and slash games
Tiger Electronics handheld games
Video games developed in Japan
Video games featuring female protagonists
Video games set in castles
Virtual Console games
WonderSwan Color games
Xbox 360 Live Arcade games
ZX Spectrum games
Video games scored by David Whittaker
Video games scored by Jeroen Tel
Virgin Interactive games
Golden Axe
Nintendo Switch Online games